Mário Bastos (born 1986), often known by the stage name Fradique, is an Angolan filmmaker. He is notable as the director of the films Alambamento, Independência and Ar Condicionado. Apart from directing, he is also a writer, producer, assistant director and editor.

Personal life
He was born in 1986 in Luanda, Angola.

Career
In 2008, Fradique attended the New York Film Academy and obtained his bachelor's degree in fine arts (directing) at the Academy of Art University in San Francisco. In 2009, he made his first short film, Alambamento. The film won the award for the Best Short Film at the Luanda International Film Festival and was an Official Selection in the Vancouver International Film Festival and Tenerife International Film Festival.

In 2010, Fradique formed the production company Geração 80 with Jorge Cohen and Tchiloia Lara. In 2011, he attended the Berlinale Talent Campus for further studies. From 2010 to 2015, he worked on his first full-length documentary, Independência. The film focuses on Angola's liberation struggle and later won Angola's Culture National Prize for Cinema. The film also won the award for the Best Documentary at the Cameron International Film Festival and was an Official Selection at the Durban International Film Festival, Luxor African Film Festival and the Pan African Film Festival.

He also directed art-house music videos for Angolan artists such as Nástio Mosquito and Aline Frazão. In 2020, he made his first fiction film, Ar Condicionado, which had its premier at the Rotterdam International Film Festival. It was the official selection for Uganda at the Fribourg International Film Festival in 2020.

Filmography

References

External links
 

Living people
Angolan film directors
1986 births